Damonte Coxie (born November 28, 1997) is a professional gridiron football wide receiver for the Toronto Argonauts of the Canadian Football League (CFL).

University career
After using a redshirt season in 2016, Coxie played college football for the Memphis Tigers from 2017 to 2020. He played in 43 games where he had 185 receptions for 2,948 yards and 20 touchdowns.

Professional career
After going undrafted in the 2021 NFL Draft, Coxie had a tryout with the Green Bay Packers, but was not signed.

Following a year in which he did not play football, Coxie was signed by the Toronto Argonauts on January 24, 2022. He spent training camp with the team in 2022 and was added to the team's practice roster prior to the start of the regular season. After the team's receiving corps was beset by injuries, Coxie made his professional debut on July 31, 2022, against the Ottawa Redblacks. He made his first career reception in his second game, on August 20, 2022, against the Calgary Stampeders.

Personal life
Coxie was born to parents Monte Weathers and Donald Coxie. His father, Donald, was killed in a car accident was Coxie was seven years old.

References

External links
Toronto Argonauts bio 

1997 births
Living people
American football wide receivers
Canadian football wide receivers
Memphis Tigers football players
Players of American football from Louisiana
Players of Canadian football from Louisiana
People from St. John the Baptist Parish, Louisiana
Toronto Argonauts players